The committees of the 5th Supreme People's Assembly (SPA) were elected by the 1st Session of the aforementioned body on 28 December 1972. It was replaced on 17 December 1977 by the committees of the 6th Supreme People's Assembly.

Committees

Bills

Budget

Credentials
Only one member was made public.

National Defence

References

Citations

Bibliography
Books:
 

5th Supreme People's Assembly
1972 establishments in North Korea
1977 disestablishments in North Korea